Bert Zara (born in Sydney, New South Wales) is an Australian former rugby league footballer for the Eastern Suburbs club in the New South Wales Rugby League premiership competition.

Career playing statistics

Point scoring summary

Matches played

Rugby league players from Sydney
Sydney Roosters players
Living people
Year of birth missing (living people)